Catogenus thomasi is a species of parasitic flat bark beetle in the family Passandridae. It is found in North America.

References

Further reading

 
 
 
 
 

Passandridae
Articles created by Qbugbot
Beetles described in 1989